George Washington House in Barbados is a historic house where the future first U.S. President George Washington is alleged to have stayed in 1751.

He was 19 years old at the time and traveling with his half-brother, Lawrence Washington, who was suffering from tuberculosis. George Washington contracted [small pox] during his stay, and was nursed back to health at the house. Barbados apparently was the only country outside the present United States that George Washington ever visited.

According to researchers at Founders Online, part of the U.S. National Archives, it is unlikely that this house was the one George Washington and his brother visited, as "it bears no resemblance to the architecture of the mid–1700s. Even if it had been standing in [George Washington]’s time, it could not have survived the devastating hurricanes of  1780 and  1831, which nearly destroyed Bridgetown and brought havoc to the entire island. Some credence was given the legend when an official historic sites committee in 1910 referred to the building as Crofton’s House and associated it with [Washington]. Tourist literature still designates the place 'the Washington House,' but the question of its authenticity has been disposed of by local historians." The researchers cite an article by Neville Connell, 'Historic Sites Re-Visited: Crofton’s House', in Vol. 12, pages 208–11 of The Journal of the Barbados Museum and Historical Society (1945) as a reference.

In 1997, during an official visit to Barbados with her husband, President Bill Clinton, First Lady Hillary Clinton unveiled a plaque outside the house that reads:

On the occasion of his visit to Barbados this plaque was presented by President William Jefferson Clinton to The Right Honourable Owen S. Arthur, Prime Minister, and to the People of Barbados in a spirit of friendship and goodwill which binds our two countries and in recognition that George Washington, the first President of the United States of America, lived in this house during his visit to this fair country in 1751.

In 2011, the property was designated as a UNESCO protected property within the World Heritage Site of Historic Bridgetown and its Garrison area. The house is owned and maintained by the Barbados National Trust.

See also
List of historic buildings in Bridgetown and Saint Ann's Garrison

References

External links

George Washington House, TripAdvisor.com

Buildings and structures in Bridgetown
George Washington
Barbados–United States relations
World Heritage Sites in Barbados
Houses in Barbados